Floatr is the third studio album by English alternative rock band Happyness. It was released on 1 May 2020 under Infinit Suds.

Critical reception
Floatr was met with generally favorable reviews from critics. At Metacritic, which assigns a weighted average rating out of 100 to reviews from mainstream publications, this release received an average score of 77, based on 6 reviews.

Track listing

Charts

References

2020 albums